This List of Diplomats from the United Kingdom to other German States deals with diplomatic representation in Germany before German unification in the late 19th century. In that period, Germany consisted of many small sovereign states within the Holy Roman Empire (until 1805) then the German Empire.

Separate lists
The following lists of diplomats exist as separate articles:
For envoys to the Holy Roman Emperor see Austria.
For envoys to the Imperial Diet at Ratisbon see Bavaria.
For envoys to the Imperial Court at Brussels see Belgium.
List of diplomats from the United Kingdom to Bavaria
List of diplomats from the United Kingdom to the Elector of Cologne
List of diplomats from the United Kingdom to the Hanseatic League
List of diplomats from the United Kingdom to Hanover
List of diplomats from the United Kingdom to Prussia (including to the Elector of Brandenberg)
List of diplomats from the United Kingdom to Saxony
but 1698-1763 see Poland (when the Elector was king of Poland)
List of diplomats from the United Kingdom to Württemberg

Minor states with missions

Brunswick–Wolfenbüttel
1689–1714: As Hanover
1729 and 1730–1731: Richard Sutton
1745: Onslow Burrish
1761–1762: Colonel John Clavering
1765 and 1775–1776: Colonel William Faucitt
1794: Hon. William Eliot (special mission)
1794: James Harris, 1st Earl of Malmesbury (extraordinary mission)
1798: Thomas Grenville (special mission – may not have arrived)
Then: No mission
1847–1856: John Duncan Bligh

Hesse–Cassel
1694–1695: Sir William Dutton Colt Envoy-extraordinary
1695–1697: George Stepney Minister then from 1695 Envoy-extraordinary
1700: Philip Plantamour
1706–1707: George Stepney Envoy-extraordinary and Plenipotentiary
1717–1720: James Haldane Minister
1727–1729: Richard Sutton Envoy-extraordinary
1742–1743: Thomas Villiers Minister Plenipotentiary
1745: Onslow Burrish
1757: Philip Stanhope
1760–1763: Colonel John Clavering Resident
1775–1777: Colonel William Faucitt military mission to raise troops
1784–1801: Ralph Heathcote senior Minister Plenipotentiary (also to Cologne)
1786: John, Viscount Dalrymple
1787: Lieut–Gen. William Faucitt
1794: Francis Seymour-Conway, 17th Earl of Yarmouth
1801–1806: Brook Taylor
1806–1815: No diplomatic relations due to Napoleonic War
1815–1826: No diplomatic relations
1826–1866: The envoy to the German Confederation (resident at Frankfurt) was also accredited to Hesse–Cassel.

Liège
1742–1744: Onslow Burrish Secretary then in 1744 Resident (afterwards at Cologne)
1747–1755: George Cressner Resident (afterwards at Cologne)

Lorraine
1699: Richard Hill

Mecklenburg-Schwerin
1709: John Wich (see Hanseatic League)
Then no representation until 1847
1847: Colonel George Lloyd Hodges (see Hanseatic League)
From 1847: as Prussia

Palatinate
1695–1697 and 1701: George Stepney Envoy-extraordinary
1711: Charles Whitworth Envoy-extraordinary
1719–1720: James Haldane
1726: Isaac Heup
No further missions until after 1777, when the Elector Palatine inherited Bavaria, after which see Bavaria

Minor States without regular representation
These are states occasionally visited by diplomats, who were primarily accredited to larger states:
Anhalt-Dessau: No mission until 1847, then as Prussia.
Anhalt-Zerbst: Special mission in 1777–1778 by William Faucitt.
Baden-Baden: 1747–1758 as Cologne.
Baden (Grand Duke): from 1841 as Württemberg.
Bishop of Bamberg: 1742-1758 as Cologne.
Brandenburg-Anspach: 1742–1758 as Cologne; 1777 as Hesse-Cassel
Brandenburg-Bayreuth: 1742-1758 as Cologne
Hesse-Darmstadt: 1726 and 1743–1758 as Hesse Cassel
Holstein-Gottorp: 1709 John Wich (see Hanseatic League)
Elector of Mainz: 1695–1696 as Palatinate; 1726, 1745–1758, and 1763–1781 as Cologne
Mecklenburg-Strelitz: 1761: Simon Harcourt, 1st Earl Harcourt Ambassador and Plenipotentiary to negotiate the royal marriage. From 1847 as Prussia
Nassau: 1847–1848 and 1851–1866: as Prussia
Saxe-Altenburg, Saxe-Coburg-Gotha, Saxe-Meiningen, and Saxe-Weimar-Eisenach: from 1847 as Saxony
Count of Oldenburg: from 1847 as Hanover
Elector of Trier: 1695–1769: same as Mainz
Prince of Waldeck: 1776: special mission by William Faucitt
Bishop of Würzburg: 1727 and 1742–1758: as Cologne

References

Germany, other states